Hong Kong mahjong scoring rules are used for scoring in mahjong, the game for four players, common in Hong Kong and some areas in Guangdong.

Criteria 
A hand is considered a winning hand when it has 4 melds and a pair or is considered a special hand.

Points are obtained by matching the winning hand and the winning condition with a specific set of criteria, with different criteria scoring different values.  Some of these criteria may be subsets of other criteria (for example, having a meld of one dragon versus having a meld of all of them), and in these cases, only the criteria with the tighter requirements are scored.  The points obtained may be translated into scores for each player using some (typically exponential) function.  When gambling with mahjong, these scores are typically directly translated into sums of money.  Some criteria may also be in terms of both points and score.

The terminology of point differs from variation to variation.  A common English term is double, as the point-to-score translation is typically exponential with a base of 2. Cantonese variants will use the term 番 (pinyin: fān / jyutping: faan1).

Because points and score are two distinct concepts, this article will adopt the use of the term score unit to refer to a point in a player's score.

At the beginning of each game, each player is given a fixed score, usually in the form of scoring chips.  In many cases, only the winner scores, with the winner's gain being deducted from the three losers' scores (that is, the losers pay the winner).  In many cases, there exist other modifiers to the score.  A common set of modifiers (for which this article will call the standard payment variations) include:

 In the case where a player wins by a discard (a player picks off an opponent), the player who performs the discard pays double
 In the case where a player wins by a draw (a player wins by self-pick), every losing player pays double.
 In the case where a player wins from a high-risk scenario (see below), the player who performs the discard pays for the other two losing players (in addition to the normal double share).

There is no universally followed rule determining when a player runs out of score units.  In some circles, the match is immediately aborted, with the player furthest ahead in score declared the winner, while in others, a player out of scoring chips continues to play without risk of further losses.

Mahjong is sometimes played in a gambling setting. Poker chips are used for keeping score only.  Since Mahjong is a zero-sum game, when one player loses all his chips, his chips are distributed among the other winners.  In this case, the loser pays cash to buy back the chips from the winners and the game continues. Before the game starts, all players must agree upon how much one set of chips (100 unit) is worth.  Some gamblers do away with chips and pay cash after each round depending on local laws regarding legality of gambling.

The criteria mentioned below are by no means exhaustive or common to every variation, but are common to many 13-tile and 16-tile variations.

Terminology 
The following is a list of the different terms describing the progress of one's hand:

 獨聽 (duk6 teng1) - Known in English typically as a one-shot win or a last-chance win, this occurs if the winner was looking for one and only one tile to win the hand (e.g., the middle tile in a Chow).  In some variations, this may extend to cases where two or more tiles could win the hand, but all but one were previously discarded.
 雞糊 (gai1 wu2) - Also known in some circles as 推倒胡 (tuī dǎo hú/teoi1 dit3 wu4) or 雞胡 (ji hú/gai1 wu4 "Chicken Hand"), this is used to describe a winning hand worth zero fān, or no points. For games with a minimum fān score, this can also describe those with insufficient fān.
 詐糊 (zaa3 wu2) - Known in English literally as a trick hand, used to describe a "false alarm" when a player claims to have won the amount claimed but in fact has not.
 食糊 (sik6 wu2) - Winning off another player's discard.
 叫糊 (giu3 wu2) - A "ready" or "waiting" hand, one tile away from winning.

Non-standard special hands
These hands are not standard hands, but can be used to win nonetheless. Because they diverge from the criteria for a normal winning hand, it is inherently risky to attempt these hands: effectively all pieces need to be self-drawn since melds are not useful to these hands

 Thirteen Orphans  + any tile in the set - also known in English as thirteen terminal hand or thirteen wonders and known in Cantonese as 十三幺 (sap6 saam1 jiu1), this occurs in 13-tile variants when the winning hand consists of one of each one, nine, wind, and dragon, and a 14th tile.  Because the hand is so greatly divergent from the standard hand, this hand is generally considered the highest scoring hand of any kind, although it is not the hand that is least likely to occur - the nine gates (1112345678999 in one suit, going out on any other tile in that suit) is said to be some 450 times more rare, barring criteria that are probabilistic in nature.  Thus, in scoring systems where a maximum point value is imposed, this is often an automatic limit hand.

Scoring table 

The largest group of criteria concern the contents of the winning hand.  Typically, a hand that is more improbable will score higher than one that is more common, but this may not be the case.  In variations with scoring minimums, it is generally accepted that, barring improbable high-scoring hands (such as the Heavenly Hand described below, even if the winning hand is otherwise scoreless), at least one point must be from this set of criteria. It is not uncommon for players to define minimum fan requirements for declaring a winning hand (typically 1 or 2), and at times a maximum fan cap or ceiling (for example at 7 or 8 fan). Also note that generally speaking in Hong Kong mahjong, 13 fan is considered the absolute limit for fan.

Notes

A double wind, where a certain wind is both the winner's seat wind and the prevailing wind, counts as 2 fan.

It is possible to obtain the maximum fan (13) from only bonuses. For example, a player draws the second last tile from the wall, declares a Kong and wins on the replacement tile.
Depending on variation, there may also be the additional requirement of winning by self-pick, in which case, this is known as men qing zi mo, or purely concealed self-drawn hand.

Point translation function 

The point translation function is, as stated above, typically an exponential function.  The function itself is subject to variation, typically to set an upper bound:

 In the traditional style, there is a four-point maximum: a hand worth more than four points pays exactly the same as one worth exactly as a four-point hand.  Thus, a limit hand scores 16 times the value of a scoreless hand.
 In some styles there is a rule stating that if a hand is worth one point or less it scores nothing.
 In the more modern style, which expands on the traditional style, a second limit (i.e. doubling) is set at the seventh point, and optionally, a third limit at the tenth point.  Thus, a seven-point hand is worth double that of hands that are between four and six points.  The English terms for each limit is typically titled full house (double full house for seven-to-nine-point hands, and so on).  This modern style is commonly used by younger generations who find the traditional styles more boring, and by gamblers who require a minimum of one point to win.
 In the parlor style, named for mahjong parlors (officially mahjong schools) in Hong Kong, the translation function is constant.  This is because gambling, with the exception of bets placed with the Hong Kong Jockey Club on horse racing and football, is forbidden, and thus the constant function is used as "prize money".
 In the most extreme of styles, there is no limit - every point doubles the score.  Due to the fast growth of exponential functions the constant for a zero-point hand is set very low, and a minimum point value (typically three point) is imposed, as lower scores are often considered to be game spoilers.

Simplified faan point-base point table

The faan value of a hand is converted into base points which are then used to calculate the money (or "points") the losers pay the winner. The following is the Old Hong Kong simplified table, for other tables see Hong Kong Mahjong scoring rules.

This table is based on play where 3 faan is the minimum needed in order to win with a legal hand. If a player has 3 faan then his hand is worth one base point. A winning hand with 9 faan is worth 4 base points. Losing players must give the winning player the value of these base points. Individual players must double the amount of base-points owed for the following:
 If the winner wins from the wall the base points is doubled.
 If the hand was won by discard, the discarder doubles the amount he owes the winner
 If the winner is east all losers double the basepoints
 If east player is a losing player he pays double the points to the winner.

If two of these criteria apply to any player...then the player must double and then redouble the points owed to the winner.

Examples 

Hong Kong Mahjong is essentially a payment system of doubling and redoubling where winning from the wall adds great value to the final payment and where the dealer is highly rewarded or penalized if he or she wins or loses.

Traditional faan point-base point table

The faan value of a hand is converted into base points which are then used to calculate the money (or "points") the losers pay the winner. The following is the Old Hong Kong simplified table, for other tables see Hong Kong Mahjong scoring rules.

This table is similar to simplified but allows payments for hands of less than 3 faan. If a player has 3 faan then his hand is worth eight base points. A winning hand with 9 faan is worth 32 base points. Losing players must give the winning player the value of these base points. Individual players must double the amount of base-points owed for the following:
 If the winner wins from the wall the base points is doubled.
 If the hand was won by discard, the discarder doubles the amount he owes the winner
 If the winner is east all losers double the basepoints
 If east player is a losing player he pays double the points to the winner.

If two of these criteria apply to any player...then the player must double and then redouble the points owed to the winner.

Examples

Canton Fan point-base point table

The faan value of a hand is converted into base points which are then used to calculate the money (or "points") the losers pay the winner. The following is the Old Hong Kong simplified table, for other tables see Hong Kong Mahjong scoring rules.

This table is based on play where 3 faan is the minimum needed in order to win with a legal hand. If a player has 3 faan then his hand is worth eight base points. A winning hand with 9 faan is worth 128 base points. Losing players must give the winning player the value of these base points. Individual players must double the amount of base-points owed for the following:
 If the winner wins from the wall the base points is doubled.
 If the hand was won by discard, the discarder doubles the amount he owes the winner
 If the winner is east all losers double the basepoints
 If east player is a losing player he pays double the points to the winner.

If two of these criteria apply to any player...then the player must double and then redouble the points owed to the winner.

Examples 

Hong Kong Mahjong is essentially a payment system of doubling and redoubling where winning from the wall adds great value to the final payment and where the dealer is highly rewarded or penalized if he or she wins or loses.

Penalties

See also
Scoring in Mahjong
Mahjong Competition Rules

References

Mahjong